Carlos Marichal (born 1948) is a Mexican economic historian who currently works at El Colegio de México, where he has taught since 1989. He has done research and published widely on the economic and financial history of Latin America.

Life and career 
He received his Ph.D. in history from Harvard University (1977) and has been visiting professor at Stanford University (1998-1999), Universidad Carlos III de Madrid (1996), École des hautes études en sciences sociales (1994), Universidad Autónoma de Barcelona (1990, 1993 and 2009) and Universidad Complutense de Madrid (1987).

His best known work is the book A Century of Debt Crises in Latin America: From Independence to the Great Depression, 1820-1930 (Princeton University Press, 1989). Barry Eichengreen wrote about Marichal's book as follows:

He  is also the author of Bankruptcy of Empire: Mexican Silver and the Wars Between Spain, Britain, and France (Cambridge University Press, 2007). In September 2008, this work received the Alice Hanson Jones Biennial Prize of the Economic History Association of the United States, as “Outstanding Book on North American Economic History”. Almost a year later in August 2009, the same work was awarded the Jaume Vicens Vives Prize of the Spanish Economic History Association, being judged the best book published on the economic history of Spain and Latin America in the biennial period of 2007–2008.
His more recently book publication is  Nueva historia de las grandes crisis financieras, 1873-2008 (Random House Mondadori, 2010). He is also the editor of a dozen collective monographs on the economic history of Latin America, including studies on banking and fiscal history as well as a number of joint studies on history of enterprise in Mexico in the nineteenth and twentieth centuries.

He is founder and past president of the Mexican Economic History Association (2001-2004), and has served as member of the executive committee of the International Economic History Association from 2000 to 2008. He received a Guggenheim fellowship in 1994-1995 and a Tinker Fellowship in 1997/98, as well other awards.  He is also member of the academic boards of ten international journals on economic history and Latin American history, he is member of the Mexican Sistema Nacional de Investigadores, at the highest level. From 2003 until  2008 he was a member of the Board of Governors of El Colegio de México.

Books 
As author

Nueva Historia de las Grandes Crisis Financieras (Random House Mondadori, 2010) .
Bankruptcy of Empire: Mexican Silver and the Wars Between Spain, Britain and France, 1760-1810 (Cambrdige University Press, 2007) .
La Bancarrota del Virreinato: 1780-1810: La Nueva España y las Finanzas del Imperio Español. (Fondo de Cultura Económica, 1999) .
El primer siglo de la hacienda pública del Estado de México, 1824-1923. with Manuel Miño and Paolo Riguzzi (El Colegio Mexiquense, 1994) .
A Century of Debt Crises in Latin America: From Independence to the Great Depression, 1820-1930 (Princeton University Press, 1989) .
Historia de la Deuda Externa de América Latina (Alianza Editorial, 1989) .
La Revolución Liberal y los Primeros partidos políticos en España, 1834-1844 (Cátedra, 1980) .
Spain, A New Society, 1834-1844 (Tamesis, 1977) .

As editor

Pensar el Antimperialismo: Ensayos sobre Historia Intelectual de América Latina. ed. with Alexandra Pita. (El Colegio de México/ Universidad de Colima, 2012).
El secreto del imperio: los situados coloniales en el siglo XVIIIed. with Johanna von Grafenstein.(El Colegio de México / Instituto Mora, 2012).
La banque francaise en Amérique Latine with Albert Broder. (Maison des Sciences de l´Homme, 2010).
Latinoamérica y España, 1800-1850. Un crecimiento económico nada excepcional ed. with Enrique Llopis. (Marcial Pons-Instituto Mora, 2009)
Crear la nación, los nombres de los países de América Latina ed. with José Carlos Chiaramonte and Aimer Granados.(Sudamericana, 2008).
Crónica Gráfica de los Impuestos en México, Siglos XVI-XX(Secretaría de Hacienda y Crédito Público, 2003)
La Banca Regional en México 1870-1930 ed. with Mario Cerutti. (Fondo de Cultura Económica / El Colegio de México, 2003)
La banca en México, 1820-1920, ed. with Leonor Ludlow. (nstituto Mora / El Colegio de México / Universidad Nacional Autónoma de México-Instituto de Investigaciones Históricas / El Colegio de Michoacán, 1998).
Un siglo de deuda pública en México ed. with Leonor Ludlow (El Colegio de México, 1998).
Foreign Investment in Latin America: Impact on Economic Development, 1850-1930 (Universitá Bocconi, 1996).
Las inversiones extranjeras en América Latina, 1850-1930: nuevos debates y problemas en historia económica comparada (El Colegio de México / Fideicomiso Historia de las Américas / Fondo de Cultura Económica, 1995.)
La formación de la banca central en España y América Latina ed. with Pedro Tedde. ( Banco de España, 1994).
Banca y Poder en México, 1880-1925ed. with Leonor Ludlow (Grijalbo, 1986).

References

External links 
 Marichal's personal web site
 Marichal´s Resume at  El Colegio de México
 Website devoted to Mexico´s Oil Industry History managed by Carlos Marichal
 Website with scans of official documents of the Mexican Treasury between 1822 - 1910 managed by Carlos Marichal.

Living people
Latin Americanists
Historians of Latin America
Harvard University alumni
1948 births
Academic staff of the Charles III University of Madrid